Sameleh (also Romanized as Sāmeleh and Sāmelah; also known as Bāqerābād and Bāqīrābād) is a village in Kivanat Rural District, Kolyai District, Sonqor County, Kermanshah Province, Iran. At the 2006 census, its population was 285, in 75 families.

References 

Populated places in Sonqor County